A multi-pack also known as multipack is packaging that combines or holds multiple items or smaller packages.

Functions
Multi-packs can be used to:
 Combine several items for a larger unit of sale, often with a reduced individual cost
 Provide a package handle to conveniently carry several items
 Help prevent package pilferage
 Provide a tamper indicating seal
 Reduce environmental impact of secondary packaging
 Keep items clean
 Obscure the bar codes on the individual combined items and provide a new one for the multi-pack

Methods
A wide variety of materials and procedures are available to combine items or packages into a multi-pack.  This can include shrink film, pressure sensitive tape, paper overwrap, adhesives, paperboard carriers, plastic clips, etc.

Beverages
Beverage cans and bottles are sold in multi-packs such as six packs, twelve packs, and cases of 24.  These can be paperboard baskets, paperboard overwraps and cartons, corrugated fiberboard boxes, HDPE plastic handles, six pack rings, and shrink packs.

Other uses
A wide variety of items and packages are combined into multi-packs for sale.

Gallery

See also
 Shrink wrap
 Plastic wrap
 Plastic bag

References

 Soroka, W, "Fundamentals of Packaging Technology", IoPP, 2002, 
 Yam, K. L., "Encyclopedia of Packaging Technology", John Wiley & Sons, 2009, 

Packaging